Steve Hansard (born 28 August 1953) is an Australian former rugby league footballer who played in the 1970s and 1980s.

Playing career
Hansard was a halfback and five-eighth with the Newtown club and Cronulla-Sutherland Sharks in the 1970s. He played halfback for the Sharks in the 1978 Grand Final & 1978 Grand Final replay. A whole-hearted player, Steve Hansard retired from first grade football at the conclusion of the 1981 NSWRFL season.

References

1953 births
Living people
Australian rugby league players
Newtown Jets players
Cronulla-Sutherland Sharks players
Rugby league halfbacks
Rugby league five-eighths
Rugby league players from Sydney